In statistics and in particular in regression analysis, leverage is a measure of how far away the independent variable values of an observation are from those of the other observations. High-leverage points, if any, are outliers with respect to the independent variables. That is, high-leverage points have no neighboring points in  space, where  is the number of independent variables in a regression model. This makes the fitted model likely to pass close to a high leverage observation. Hence high-leverage points have the potential to cause large changes in the parameter estimates when they are deleted i.e., to be influential points. Although an influential point will typically have high leverage, a high leverage point is not necessarily an influential point. The leverage is typically defined as the diagonal elements of the hat matrix.

Definition and interpretations
Consider the linear regression model  , . That is, where,  is the  design matrix whose rows correspond to the observations and whose columns correspond to the independent or explanatory variables. The leverage score for the  independent observation  is given as:
, the  diagonal element of the ortho-projection matrix (a.k.a hat matrix) .
It can also be interpreted as the degree by which the  measured (dependent) value (i.e.) influences the  fitted (predicted) value (i.e.): mathematically,  

.

Hence, the leverage score is also known as the observation self-sensitivity or self-influence. Using the fact that  (i.e., the prediction  is ortho-projection of  onto range space of ) in the above expression, we get . Note that this leverage depends on the values of the explanatory variables  of all observations but not on any of the values of the dependent variables .

Properties

 The leverage   is a number between 0 and 1,  Proof: Note that  is idempotent matrix and symmetric. Thus, by using the fact that , we have . Since we know that , we have .
Proof: .

Determination of outliers in X using leverages 
Large leverage  correspond  that is extreme. A common rule is to identify  whose leverage value  is more than 2 times larger than the mean leverage  (see property 2 above). That is, if ,  shall be considered as an outlier.

Relation to Mahalanobis distance 
Leverage is closely related to the Mahalanobis distance (proof). This is related to the leverage  of the hat matrix of  after appending a column vector of 1's to it. The relationship between the two is:

This relationship enables us to decompose leverage into meaningful components  so that some sources of high leverage can be investigated analytically.

Relation to influence functions 
In a regression context, we combine leverage and influence functions to compute the degree to which estimated coefficients would change if we removed a single data point.

 

Young (2019) uses a version of this formula after residualizing controls. To gain intuition for this formula, note that  captures the potential for an observation to affect the regression parameters, and therefore  captures the actual influence of that observations' deviations from its fitted value on the regression parameters. Similar formulas arise when applying general formulas for statistical influences functions in the regression context.

Effect on residual variance
If we are in an ordinary least squares setting with fixed  and  homoscedastic regression errors  , then the  regression residual,  has variance
.
In other words, an observation's leverage score determines the degree of noise in the model's misprediction of that observation, with higher leverage leading to less noise.

The corresponding studentized residual—the residual adjusted for its observation-specific estimated residual variance—is then

Partial leverage 
Partial leverage (PL) is a measure of the contribution of the individual independent variables to the total leverage of each observation. That is, PL is a measure of how  changes as a variable is added to the regression model. It is computed as:

 

Note that the partial leverage is the leverage of the  point in the partial regression plot for the  variable. Data points with large partial leverage for an independent variable can exert undue influence on the selection of that variable in automatic regression model building procedures.

Software implementations
Many programs and statistics packages, such as R, Python, etc., include implementations of Leverage.

See also
 Projection matrix – whose main diagonal entries are the leverages of the observations
 Mahalanobis distance – a (scaled) measure of leverage of a datum
 Partial leverage
Cook's distance – a measure of changes in regression coefficients when an observation is deleted
 DFFITS
 Outlier – observations with extreme Y values
 Degrees of freedom (statistics), the sum of leverage scores

References

Regression diagnostics